Ronald David Merson (25 July 1925 — 10 April 2011) was an English first-class cricketer and physician.

Merson was born at Stockton-on-Tees in July 1925. He was educated north of the border in Scotland at both Merchiston Castle School and Edinburgh Academy, before matriculating to the University of Edinburgh. Playing his club cricket for Edinburgh University, Merson was selected to play for the Scottish cricket team against Warwickshire at Edgbaston during Scotland's 1947 tour of England. Batting from the upper-middle order, he was dismissed in the Scottish first innings for a single run by Eric Hollies, while in their second innings batting from the lower-middle order, he was dismissed for 15 runs by Godfrey Pell. After graduating from Edinburgh University, Merson practised as a doctor. He was commissioned on a short service appointment with the medical branch of the Royal Air Force in June 1952, with the rank of flying officer. Promotion to flight lieutenant followed in June 1953, with a further promotion to squadron leader following in June 1958. Merson died at Stockton-on-Tees in April 2011.

References

External links
 

1925 births
2011 deaths
People from Stockton-on-Tees
Cricketers from Stockton-on-Tees
People educated at Merchiston Castle School
People educated at Edinburgh Academy
Alumni of the University of Edinburgh
English cricketers
Scotland cricketers
20th-century English medical doctors
Royal Air Force officers